Bellamyus is a genus of beetles in the family Buprestidae, containing the following species:

 Bellamyus acutiformis Curletetti, 2002
 Bellamyus fulgidus Curletetti, 1997
 Bellamyus maddalenae Curletetti, 2002
 Bellamyus opacus Curletetti & Bellamy, 2005

References

Buprestidae genera